Grant Anderson may refer to:
 Grant Anderson (footballer) (born 1986), Scottish footballer
 Grant Anderson (Highland games), Scottish weightlifter and Highland Games competitor
 Grant Anderson (rugby league, born 1969), rugby league footballer of the 1980s and 1990s
 Grant Anderson (rugby union, born August 1989), Scotland 7s international rugby union player
 Grant Anderson (rugby union, born September 1989), English rugby union player
 Grant Anderson (rugby league, born 1999), Australian rugby league player

See also
 J. Grant Anderson (born 1897), Scottish actor, writer, and theatre director